Gerriadai was a town of ancient Ionia, near Teos.

Its site is located near the modern Sığacık Liman, Asiatic Turkey.

References

Populated places in ancient Ionia
Former populated places in Turkey